The Bringewood Beds is a geologic formation in England. It preserves fossils dating back to the Silurian period.

See also

 List of fossiliferous stratigraphic units in England

References
 

Geologic formations of England
Silurian System of Europe
Silurian England